This is a list of newspapers in Virginia.

Daily, weekly and other newspapers (currently published)

University newspapers
 Brackety-Ack — student newspaper of Roanoke College
 The Breeze — student newspaper of James Madison University
 The Broadside — student newspaper of George Mason University
 The Bullet — student newspaper of the University of Mary Washington
 The Buzz — student newspaper of Shenandoah University
 The Cadet — student newspaper of Virginia Military Institute
 The Captain's Log — student newspaper of Christopher Newport University
 The Cavalier Daily — student newspaper of the University of Virginia
 The Collegian — student newspaper of the University of Richmond
 Collegiate Times — student newspaper of Virginia Tech
 The Commonwealth Times — student newspaper of Virginia Commonwealth University
 The Critograph — student newspaper of Lynchburg College
 Fourth Estate - student newspaper at George Mason University
 The Flat Hat — student newspaper of the College of William & Mary
 The Hampden-Sydney Tiger — student newspaper of Hampden-Sydney College
 The Hampton Script — student newspaper of Hampton University
 The Highland Cavalier — student newspaper of the University of Virginia's College at Wise
 Hollins Columns — student newspaper of Hollins University
 The Iron Blade — student newspaper of Ferrum College
 The Liberty Champion — student newspaper of Liberty University
 The Mace & Crown — student newspaper of Old Dominion University
 The Marlin Chronicle — student newspaper of Virginia Wesleyan College
 Ring-tum Phi — student newspaper of the Washington and Lee University
 The Rotunda — student newspaper of Longwood University
 Spartan Echo — student newspaper of Norfolk State University
 The Tartan — student newspaper of Radford University
 Virginia Law Weekly — student newspaper of the University of Virginia School of Law
 The Weathervane — student newspaper of Eastern Mennonite University
 The Yellow Jacket — student newspaper of Randolph-Macon College

Defunct newspapers

 Newspapers by locale 

Alexandria

Newspapers published in Alexandria, Virginia:

 Alexandria Advertiser and Commercial Intelligencer. D., Dec. 8–31, 1800+ 
 The Columbian Mirror and Alexandria Gazette. S.W., T.W., Nov. 21, 1792 – Dec. 6, 1800.
 The Times. Alexandria Advertiser. D., Apr. 10, 1797 – Apr. 16 1799.
 The Times; and District Of Columbia Daily Advertiser. D., Apr. 17, 1799 – Dec. 31, 1800+
 The Virginia Gazette and Alexandria Advertiser. W., July 30(?), 1789 – Nov. 1793.
 The Virginia Journal, and Alexandria Advertiser. W., Feb. 5, 1784 – July 4, 1789.

Dumfries
Newspapers published in Dumfries, Virginia:

 The Virginia Gazette, and Agricultural Repository. W., Sept. 29, 1791 – Dec. 19, 1793.

Fincastle
Newspapers published in Fincastle, Virginia:

 The Herald Of Virginia, and Fincastle Weekly Advertiser. W., March – Dec. 27, 1800+

Fredericksburg
Newspapers published in Fredericksburg, Virginia:

 The Genius Of Liberty; and Fredericksburg & Falmouth Advertiser. W., S.W., Oct. 10, 1797 – Sept. 2, 1799.
 The Virginia Herald. S.W., Aug. 23, 1799 – Dec. 26, 1800+
 The Virginia Herald, and Fredericksburg Advertiser. W., S.W., June 7, 1787 – Oct. 16 (?), 1795.
 The Virginia Herald, and Fredericksburg & Falmouth Advertiser. S.W., Oct. 20, 1795 – Aug. 19, 1797.

Leesburg
Newspapers published in Leesburg, Virginia:

 The True American. W., November 1798–1800(?)

Norfolk
Newspapers published in Norfolk, Virginia:

 American Gazette. S.W., May 6, 1796.
 American Gazette & General Advertiser. S.W., May 10, 1796 – Nov. 7, 1797.
 American Gazette, and Norfolk and Portsmouth Public Advertiser. S.W., May 7, 1794 – Apr. 30, 1796.
 The American Gazette, and Norfolk and Portsmouth Weekly Advertiser. W., July 18, 1792 – Apr. 30, 1794.
 Epitome of the Times. S.W., Jan. 1, 1799 – Dec. 30, 1800+
 The Herald. T.W., Nov. 9–30, 1795.
 The Herald, and Norfolk and Portsmouth Advertiser. S.W., T.W., Aug. 13, 1794 – Nov. 5, 1795.
 The Norfolk and Portsmouth Chronicle. W., Aug. 29, 1789 – June (?), 1792.
 The Norfolk and Portsmouth Gazette. W., Sept. 9 – Oct. 8, 1789.
 The Norfolk and Portsmouth Journal. W., June 21, 1786 – May 13 (?), 1789.
 Norfolk Herald. T.W., Dec. 3, 1795 – Oct. 31, 1796.
 The Norfolk Herald. T.W., D., Feb. 20, 1798 – Dec. 29, 1800+
 The Norfolk Herald & Public Advertiser. T.W., Nov. 3, 1796 – Feb. 17, 1798.
 The Virginia Chronicle, & C. S.W., Nov. 13 – Dec. 19, 1794.
 The Virginia Chronicle, & General Advertiser. S.W., Apr. 11 – Nov. 10, 1794.
 Virginia Chronicle and Norfolk and Portsmouth General Advertiser. W., July 28, 1792 – Apr. 5, 1794.
 The Virginia Gazette. 1775 – Feb. 3, 1776.
 Virginia Gazette, or, Norfolk Intelligencer. June 9 (?), 1774 – Sept. 20, 1775.

Petersburg
Newspapers published in Petersburg, Virginia:

 The Independent Ledger, and Petersburg and Blandford Public Advertiser. W., Mar. 6 – May 8, 1793.
 The Petersburg Intelligencer. S.W., June 17 – Dec. 31, 1800+
 Virginia Gazette, and Petersburg Intelligencer. W., S.W., July 6 (?), 1786 – May (?), 1800.

Richmond
Newspapers published in Richmond, Virginia:

 The American Advertiser.
 The Friend of the People, A Political Paper. Fortnightly, Jan. (?) – July (?), 1800.
 The Observatory, or, A View of the Times. S.W., July 3(?), 1797 – Sept. 10(?), 1798.
 The Press. W., Jan. 6 – Feb. 7(?) 1800.
 The Richmond and Manchester Advertiser. S.W., Apr. 30, 1795 – Nov. 15, 1796.
 Richmond Chronicle. S.W., May 23, 1795 – Aug. 27, 1796.
 Richmond Whig, under various closely related titles, 1828–1888
 The Virginia Argus. S.W., Nov. 19, 1796 – Dec. 30, 1800+
 The Virginia Federalist. S.W., May 25, 1799 – Aug. 2, 1800.
 The Virginia Gazette. W., May 9, 1780 – May 19, 1781.
 The Virginia Gazette, and General Advertiser. W., S.W., Aug. 25, 1790 – Dec. 26, 1800+
 The Virginia Gazette, and Independent Chronicle. W., 1784 (?) – Sept. (?), 1789.
 The Virginia Gazette, and Richmond and Manchester Advertiser. S.W., Apr. 15, 1793 – Apr. 25, 1795.
 Virginia Gazette & Richmond Chronicle. S.W., Mar. 2, 1793 – May 19, 1795.
 Virginia Gazette and Weekly Advertiser. W., Feb. 16, 1782 – Apr. 22, 1797.
 The Virginia Gazette, or, The American Advertiser. W., Dec. 22, 1781 – Dec. 20, 1786.
 The Virginia Independent Chronicle. W., July 26, 1786 – May 6, 1789.
 The Virginia Independent Chronicle, and General Advertiser. W., May 13, 1789 – Aug. 18, 1790.

Staunton
Newspapers published in Staunton, Virginia:

 The Staunton Gazette, or, The Western Star. W., Feb. 5, 1790.
 Staunton Spectator was being published in 1859
  Staunton Spy. W., Feb. 1793 – Feb. 1, 1794.

Williamsburg
Newspapers published in Williamsburg, Virginia:

 The Virginia Gazette. 1736–1780.Colonial Williamsburg . Retrieved 2010-10-21
 Rind's Virginia Gazette. W., May 16 – Sept. 12 (?), 1766.

Winchester
Newspapers published in Winchester, Virginia:

 Bowen's Virginia Centinel & Gazette, or, The Winchester Political Repository. W., Apr. 1790 – Feb. 19, 1796.
 The Virginia Centinel, or, The Winchester Mercury. W., Apr. 2, 1788 – Apr. (?), 1790.
 The Virginia Gazette, and Winchester Advertiser. W., July 11, 1787 – Apr. 23, 1788.
 Virginia Gazette, or, The Winchester Advertiser. W., Apr. 30, 1788 – Sept. 9, 1789.
 Winchester Gazette. W., 1798 (?) – Dec. 31, 1800+

See also
 Virginia media
 List of radio stations in Virginia
 List of television stations in Virginia
 Media of cities in Virginia: Chesapeake, Hampton, Newport News, Norfolk, Richmond, Roanoke, Virginia Beach
 Journalism:
 :Category:Journalists from Virginia
 Virginia Commonwealth University Robertson School of Media and Culture (est. 1978), in Richmond
 Virginia literature

References

Bibliography
  (+ List of titles 50+ years old)
 
 
 
 Vol. 8, No. 4 (Apr., 1901), pp. 337-346 (Alexandria etc.) via Jstor
 Vol. 9, No. 4 (Apr., 1902)
 pp. 1-11
 pp. 130-138
 pp. 289-297
 pp. 411-413 (Warrenton etc.) via Jstor
 Vol. 10, No. 4 (Apr., 1903)
 pp. 225-229
 pp. 421-423 (Richmond etc.) via Jstor
 
 
 Lester J. Cappon. Virginia Newspapers, 1821–1935: A Bibliography with Historical Introduction and Notes. New York: Appleton-Century Co., 1936.
  
 Harrison A. Trexler. "The Davis Administration and the Richmond Press, 1861–1865," Journal of Southern History, 16 (May 1950), 177–195.
 Ted Tunnell. "A 'Patriotic Press': Virginia's Confederate Newspapers, 1861–1865," in William C. Davis and James I. Robertson Jr., eds., Virginia at War: 1864. Lexington: University Press of Kentucky, 2009, 35–50.

External links

 
 Bibliography of American Newspapers cataloged and inventoried by the Virginia Newspaper Project (Database searchable by locale)
  
  (Directory ceased in 2017)
  (Includes Virginia newspapers) 
 
 
 
 
 
 
 

Newspapers
Virginia